3-Mercapto-3-methylbutan-1-ol, also known as MMB, is a thiol and an alcohol. MMB is a degradation product of the amino acid felinine in cat urine and is a cat pheromone.
MMB is also found in Sauvignon blanc wines together with the related compounds 4-mercapto-4-methylpentan-2-ol and 3-mercaptohexan-1-ol.

See also 
 Cat pheromone

References 

Thiols
Primary alcohols
Pheromones